Bosutów  is a village in the administrative district of Gmina Zielonki, within Kraków County, Lesser Poland Voivodeship, in southern Poland. The village is located in the historical region Galicia.

The village has a population of 672.

References

See also
 The Lesser Polish Way

Villages in Kraków County